The electoral district of Woolloongabba was a Legislative Assembly electorate in the state of Queensland, Australia.

History
Woolloongabba was created in the 1887 redistribution, taking effect at the 1888 colonial election. It was located in south Brisbane based on Kangaroo Point.

Woolloongabba was abolished at the 1912 state election, changing only marginally to become the Electoral district of Maree.

Members

The following people were elected in the seat of Woolloongabba:

See also
 Electoral districts of Queensland
 Members of the Queensland Legislative Assembly by year
 :Category:Members of the Queensland Legislative Assembly by name

References

Former electoral districts of Queensland
1888 establishments in Australia
1912 disestablishments in Australia